The Fairmile H Landing Craft were British landing craft of the Second World War. Initially designed for commando type raids from a base in Britain as a way of probing enemy defenses and tying down additional troops, some were converted into fire support vessels.

Two variants were developed:

The Fairmile H LCI (S)
This was the Landing Craft Infantry (Small) "LCI(S)" boat.

The Fairmile H LCS (L)
This was a Landing Craft Support (LCS) boat fitted with extra weapons to give fire support to landing craft particularly in being able to provide some anti-tank capability. This was achieved by the simple expediency of mounting a tank turret complete with its gun on the forward deck.

The usual Fairmile construction techniques were used with all items  prefabricated and supplied in kit form to boatyards for assembly and fitting out.

See also
Fairmile A motor launch
Fairmile B motor launch
Fairmile C motor gun boat
Fairmile D motor torpedo boat

Notes

References
  Lambert, John and Ross, Al . Allied Coastal Forces of World War Two, Volume I : Fairmile designs and US Submarine Chasers. 1990. .

Landing craft
Ships of the Royal Navy